Vail Montgomery Pittman (September 17, 1880 – January 29, 1964) was an American politician. A member of the Democratic Party, he served as the 19th governor of Nevada.

Biography
Pittman was born in Vicksburg, Mississippi, the youngest of four sons born to William Buckner Pittman and Katherine Key Pittman, a direct descendant of Francis Scott Key. His siblings included Key Pittman, a longtime United States Senator from Nevada. William and Katherine Pittman died when Vail Pittman was an infant, and the Pittmans were raised in Lake Providence, Louisiana, by their uncle and aunt, Mr. and Mrs. Vail Montgomery.  Vail Pittman was educated by private tutors and in the public schools until he attended Sewanee Military Academy. He then attended the University of the South and Brown's Business College, but returned to Lake Providence in 1903 to manage the family cotton plantation after Vail Montgomery's death.

Career
Pittman moved to Tonopah, Nevada, in 1904, and worked initially at the Tonopah-Goldfield Lumber and Coal Company until purchasing the company's coal business and operating it as a separate company.  He sold the coal business in 1907, and subsequently engaged in a variety of occupations, including undersheriff of Nye County, sergeant-at-arms of the Nevada Senate, and partner in a mining company.  On May 20, 1919, he married Ida Louise Brewington.  In 1920 Vail and Ida Pittman bought the Ely Daily Times of Ely, Nevada, and he began a successful career in the newspaper business. Pittman was also involved in several civic and business organizations, including the good roads movement and the local chamber of commerce.  From 1925 to 1929 Pittman served in the Nevada Senate.  After his brother Key's 1940 death, Vail Pittman unsuccessfully sought the governor's appointment to his U.S. Senate seat.

Pittman was elected the 19th lieutenant governor of Nevada in 1942. He was a candidate in the Democratic primary for United States Senate in 1944, but was defeated by the incumbent, Pat McCarran. He became governor when Edward P. Carville resigned in 1945 to accept appointment to a vacant U.S. Senate seat. Pittman was elected to a full term in 1946, and served until 1951. He was an unsuccessful candidate for reelection in 1950 and in 1954, losing both times to Charles H. Russell.  After leaving office Pittman resumed operation of the Ely Daily Times. He later sold the newspaper, and became an officer of the Nevada Savings and Loan Association and the Nevada State Bank. He was involved in the Rotary Club and was a delegate to international conferences in Switzerland and Japan. He served as a delegate to the 1956 and 1960 Democratic National Conventions.

Death
Pittman died from cancer on January 29, 1964, in a hospital in San Francisco, California at the age of 83. He is interred at Masonic Memorial Gardens, Reno, Washoe County, Nevada, US.

Notes

References

External links
 
Nevada First Ladies
Nevada State Library and Archives
National Governors Association
A Guide to the Vail Montgomery Pittman Papers, NC392. Special Collections, University Libraries, University of Nevada, Reno.

1880 births
1964 deaths
Democratic Party governors of Nevada
Lieutenant Governors of Nevada
Democratic Party Nevada state senators
People from the Las Vegas Valley
Politicians from Vicksburg, Mississippi
20th-century American politicians
People from Lake Providence, Louisiana
People from Tonopah, Nevada